Madhapur Metro Station is located on the Blue Line of the Hyderabad Metro.

History
It was opened on  13 April 2019.

The station

Structure
Madhapur elevated metro station situated on the Blue Line of Hyderabad Metro.

Facilities
The stations have staircases, elevators and escalators.

Station layout
Street Level This is the first level where passengers may park their vehicles and view the local area map.

Concourse level Ticketing office or Ticket Vending Machines (TVMs) is located here. Retail outlets and other facilities like washrooms, ATMs, first aid, etc., will be available in this area.

Platform level  This layer consists of two platforms. Trains takes passengers from this level.

Entry/exit

See also

References

Hyderabad Metro stations